McKinney Boyd High School (commonly Boyd, Boyd High School, McKinney Boyd, or MBHS) is a public secondary school located on North Lake Forest Drive in McKinney, Texas, United States, that serves ninth, tenth, eleventh, and twelfth grade students. The class of 2008 was the school's first graduating class. The school is part of the McKinney Independent School District.

History and forward plans
This is the third high school in McKinney, the others being McKinney High School and McKinney North High School. Setting McKinney Boyd up proved controversial, with many students being compulsorily transferred from the other schools. Further, bussing long distances to achieve socio-economic diversity is being continued.

Opened in August 2006, McKinney Boyd is named after Mary Crane Boyd who endowed an earlier school in 1914. Starting in fall 2007, Boyd began to enroll twelfth graders, and the school's current total enrollment is approximately 3,000 students. Beginning the 2008–2009 school year, McKinney Boyd High School started to compete in the 5A classification.

Boyd High School completed all construction of its school building with the completion of the third phase over the summer of 2007.
Although the city of McKinney has been focusing on finishing its re-modeling of Highway 75, there have been three community meetings, since April 2011, regarding further construction. The city has been planning a separate building for McKinney Boyd, with its own indoor swimming pool for school use with its swim team, and to use the remaining land for a small golf course for its golf team. The building was not to have any classrooms, but be used for practice for its sports teams, such as the swim and golf team.  no other meeting had been planned, and the plan had been put on hold until the completion of the re-modeling of Highway 75 with the intention of fully re-opening its roads by March 2012.

Boyd High School opened in September 2006 at costs exceeding $88 million. Boyd's capacity is 3,000.

Extracurricular activities

Boyd allows most of its clubs to be started by some students, so long as each club has a sponsor and constitution.

Athletics
The McKinney Boyd Broncos compete in the following sports:
Baseball,
Basketball,
Bowling,
Cross Country,
Football,
Golf,
Powerlifting,
Soccer,
Softball,
Swimming and Diving,
Tennis,
Track and Field,
Volleyball, and
Wrestling.

Band
The McKinney Boyd High School Band, or the Bronco Band, has had a successful début year. Its 2006 show titled Bohemia! is based on Queen's Bohemian Rhapsody and was arranged by Dwayne Rice. The Boyd Band has competed at several marching competitions in 2006. The Boyd Band finished in sixth place in the preliminary round at the Denton Golden Triangle Classic. In the final round, they advanced to fourth place, ranking ahead of many larger bands.

They also competed at the UIL Region 3-4A Marching Band competition on October 25, 2006, and received Sweepstakes Ratings, the highest rating awarded in marching band competition. The rating signifies a First Division Rating from all three judges at the competition.

During the 2007–2008 school year the Boyd band performed the show Music for a Great City inspired by the writings of Aaron Copland. During the season the band finished ninth in finals at the Plano East marching invitational, earned unanimous first division ratings at UIL Region 25, and advanced to the 4A Area B marching contest where they earned ninth in prelims and seventh in finals. The concert bands also received their first UIL Sweepstakes awards in the spring of 2008. Both Wind Ensemble and Symphonic Band earned Sweepstakes after competing in Region 25 UIL Concert and Sight-reading.

The 2008-2009 show, titled eMotion, featured the music of Igor Stravinsky. It was made up of 4 parts, including "The Rite of Spring" and "Dumbarton Oaks". The Bronco Band gained full first division ratings at UIL All Region, and went on to play at the 5A Area marching contest. However, the band did not make it to finals.

The band's 2009 - 2010 show is titled On the Brink and was composed by Aaron Guidry. The band placed second at the Golden Triangle Classic marching invitational, losing to Wakeland. The following week, the band performed at the Plano East Marching Invitational. They placed 2nd in the prelims to Poteet; however, they went on to earn first place in finals.

The band's 2010-2011 show was entitled, Enchantment. The band's 2011-2012 was entitled, Dreams.

The band's 2012 - 2013 show was entitled Fireworks was arranged by Brian Beck and included music composed by Korsakov, Stravinsky, and Tchaikovsky. The band placed 7th at Plano East Marching Competition, got sweepstakes at UIL Region 25-5A, placed 2nd at the Wylie High School Marching Contest, finished 8th at the UIL Area B-5A Competition, and finished 9th at the Duncanvile Marching Invitational.

The band's 2013-2014 show was entitled Stardust.

The band's 2014-2015 marching season, entitled What Goes In The Night, is arranged by Carol Brittin Chambers (Percussion by Bret Kuhn) and features selections from "In the Hall of the Mountain King" by Grieg "Dream of a Witches Sabbath" by Berlioz, "Symphony Number 7" by Beethoven, and "Medea's Dance of Vengeance" by Barber. Their competition season included a second place finals finish at the 2014 Sam Houston State Marching Contest in Huntsville, TX.

The band's 2015 - 2016 show was entitled Masquerade, is arranged by Carol Brittin Chambers and features selections from Sullivan, Saint-Saëns, DiLorenzo and Holsinger. The band competitive season was highlighted with a 2nd-place finish at the 2015 Plano East Marching Invitational and an 8th-place finish at the 2015 Carrollton - Tournament of Champions.

The band's 2016-2017 program was entitled Cathedrals, and was arranged by Carol Brittin Chambers and features sections from "A Mighty Fortress Is Our God", "Elsa's Procession to the Cathedral" and "Cathedrals". The band's competitive season was highlighted by a 5th Place finish at the 2016 Carrollton - Tournament of Champions, a 5th-place finish at the 2016 Wylie Marching Invitational and a 6th-place finish at the UIL Area C Marching Contest, their highest finish to date.

The band's 2017-2018 program was entitled Ballet-Ro, and was arranged by Daniel Montoya Jr. It features selections from, Revelle, Tchaikovsky and Stravinsky. The band had yet again had a very successful season with a 2nd-place finish at the 2017 Wylie Marching Invitational including best Color Guard, a 5th-place finish at the 2017 Duncanville Marching Invitational, straight 1's at the Region 25 contest and participating in the 2017 Bands of America Dallas/Fort Worth Regional.

The band's 2018-2019 program was entitled 'The Promise of Spring', which was arranged yet again by Daniel Montoya Jr, with music selections from Stravinsky and Copland. The selections in the show included Rite of Spring, Simple Gifts, and Appalachian Spring. The Bronco Band started out with a very pleasing season, placing 16th at the Bands of America Regional Championships, 10 places higher than their previous season. Their UIL Region 25 performance was also exemplary, and they advanced to the Area 10 Contest to determine if they would advance to the Texas UIL State Marching Competition. They placed 5th in Preliminary Performance at Area Competition, but had an ok performance in finals, earning 9th.

Debate

In January 2015 the debate program was taken over by Carl Scafuro. Leading the development of the CX/Policy (Cross Examination) Debate program at McKinney Boyd, Carl developed an incredibly successful team. Debaters pioneering the CX program at McKinney Boyd were Zachary Amundson and Elmer Yang. They were the first in the school's history to qualify for TFA's State Tournament, UIL State CX Tournament, and NFL tournament in Policy Debate.

Notable alumni

Hollie Cavanagh (class of 2011), an American singer who placed 4th on the 11th season of American Idol
Jeff Fuller, NFL and CFL wide receiver, played college football at Texas A&M
Conor Doyle (class of 2009), USL soccer player
Ross Matiscik (class of 2015), NFL player

References

External links
 
 McKinney Independent School District

Educational institutions established in 2006
2006 establishments in Texas
McKinney Independent School District high schools